The Toronto French School (TFS), founded in 1962, is an independent, bilingual, co-educational, non-denominational school in Toronto, Ontario, Canada. Charles III, as King of Canada, is the royal patron of the school. The school rebranded in 2011 to become TFS – Canada's International School.

At TFS, students complete the IB PYP (Primary Years Program), MYP (Middle Years Program) and Diploma Programs (DP), in addition to the National Curriculum of France and the Ontario Ministry of Education curriculum. It is compulsory for students to study under the International Baccalaureate program in their final two years. Prior to this, students between the ages of 2 and 15 go through a broad bilingual program covering the arts, languages, natural and social sciences as well as mathematics. The school offers numerous side programs that focus on aiding students in expanding to an international level, including an optional SAT preparation course.

History
The Toronto French School was co-founded on  August 9, 1962, by Harry Giles with his wife, Anna Por. When they issued the articles of incorporation for the non-profit school, they had the objective of educating students to become fully bilingual Canadians. This would later prove to be a significant factor in distinguishing TFS from other private schools of the Canadian establishment, such as UCC and Havergal. The school began as an experiment in home schooling, and its first classes took place in rented church basements.

In its first class on September 7, 1962, the school was teaching sixteen 3–5 year olds under Mme. Nicole Corbi. Four years later, the Toronto French School owned six locations across the GTA and surrounding areas, including the Mississauga Campus, which has grades from pre-kindergarten to grade 7. They still use the campus today, as well as several small facilities that they rent.

In 1979, the school was granted Royal Patronage under Her Majesty the Queen Elizabeth II.

In 1980, the school acquired 318 Lawrence Avenue, the former Sifton Manor, and made the  plot of land its new primary location. The area of Sifton Manor itself was built in 1922 for Sir Clifford Sifton, and it was named "Armadale" in honour of his wife, Elizabeth Arma Burrows, Lady Sifton. After the Sifton family sold the property in 1947, it was owned by several other people until Giles' school bought it in 1980.

By 1984, the board of directors included Liberal politician Jean Chrétien (later Prime Minister of Canada), and a patron's council was created with such prominent names as Bata, Black, Labatt, and Eaton.

John Godfrey, a former Liberal Member of Parliament (MP) and Cabinet Minister, was headmaster from 2008 until June 2014. Under his leadership, the school rebranded as "TFS – Canada's International School" to better reflect the international nature of the bilingual school.

In November 2014, the school settled a $1.6 million lawsuit by two Muslim former students who sued for defamation due to the school's handling of a 2008 incident in which the pair were involved in an altercation after they had been subjected to racial slurs. The school apologized for its role in the affair. The former students also agreed in writing that none of the defendants admitted any misconduct in the events giving rise to the litigation.

Recent TFS parents include the film director Atom Egoyan and his actor wife Arsinée Khanjian, the journalist Jan Wong, the Ontario Court of Appeal judge John Laskin, Dr. Ann Kaplan Mulholland (star of The Real Housewives of Toronto), and the former city councillor Tom Jakobek.

Graduates attend Canada's finest universities, and several TFS students every year pursue study at America's Ivy League universities, Oxford, Cambridge or the London School of Economics in Britain. A small number of students pursue study in France, and some past TFS graduates have studied at the Université Panthéon Sorbonne and the Institut d'études politiques de Paris (Sciences Po) in Paris.

In July 2021, Norman Gaudet became TFS' interim Head of School.

Charity events
TFS takes part in several charity events throughout the year, some of which were founded by the school itself, such as Terry Fox Run, which is performed by the students and administration, and funded by the parents, the run at TFS.

House system 
Every student of TFS is a member of one of six houses. Siblings are automatically assigned to the same house. Each house elects house leaders on a yearly basis. The six houses are:

The houses compete against each other for points throughout the three terms. At the end of each year, the house with the most points receives an award.

The original House names have been retired.  They were:

 Riel: named after Canadian politician and Metis leader Louis Riel
 Laurier: named after Canadian Prime Minister Sir Wilfrid Laurier
 Richard: named after hockey player Maurice "The Rocket" Richard
 Gaston: named after the cartoon Gaston, created by Belgian cartoonist André Franquin

Location
Although TFS facilities were scattered in different areas, by the mid-eighties, the school had condensed to two locations, one in Toronto (Bayview and Lawrence) and one in Mississauga (1293 Meredith Avenue – south of The Queensway between Dixie and Cawthra).

The Toronto location acquired the old Sifton Estate (Armadale), a group of three patrician Tudor-revival/Dutch Colonial Revival architecture brick buildings on nearly 23 acres. The Sifton Estate was once occupied by Sir Clifford Sifton, a cabinet minister who served in prime minister Sir Wilfrid Laurier's government, and Lady Sifton, and it was used as a vacation home ideal for fox hunting. The Sifton mansion, now called Giles Hall, is the main building of TFS's senior school.

The TFS Toronto campus, situated at the corner of Bayview and Lawrence, overlooks the Granite Club and is nestled between the stately houses of Lawrence Park and the Bridle Path.  The school turned to Raymond Moriyama and Teshima architects, acclaimed for the National Museum of Saudi Arabia and the Canadian War Museum, to design the recent expansion of the senior school.

Campus and facilities

Play and sports field project
In 2008, TFS built a brand new main field consisting of solar AstroTurf. Made entirely of synthetic material, it was designed with the intent of being as low maintenance as possible. In case of rain, the field has a 1 km long drainage system that runs underneath, allowing the field to rapidly soak up and drain away large amounts of water.

The opening event for the new field occurred at midday November 7, 2008. All students from grade 2 to Level V were for the first time granted access to the field as parents and teachers alike photographed the event.

The field was renamed Terrain Frazer Field in 2019 in honor of then-outgoing Board Chair, Mitch Frazer.

Student body
TFS is an independent co-ed school with 1,300 day students. All students study the International Baccalaureate (IB) diploma programme during Grades Eleven and Twelve (Levels IV and V). From Pre-Kindergarten to Grade 5, students attend the Junior School program at either TFS's Toronto or Mississauga Campuses. Following this is the Senior School program. Grades Six and Seven can be done at either campus, however once the latter is complete, it is compulsory for students to switch to the Toronto Campus. TFS students in the Mississauga area have the option of taking a special "Mississauga Bus" to and from the Toronto Campus.

Grade 6 and 7
Following the French Ministry of Education guidelines, the transition from a class-based program to a subject-based program takes place in Grade 6, the beginning of the Collège level. Although students retain their homeroom base, they are taught by specialist teachers.

The curriculum is structured with clearly defined subjects. Using an interdisciplinary approach, teachers set curricula goals, individually addressing the needs of each student. The inclusion of cross-curricular project work is meant to stimulate interest, and group activities allow students to develop improved co-operative and social skills. Additionally, organizational and learning skills, such as time management, are also taught in Guidance as well as subject specific classes. TFS students spend approximately two-thirds of their day in a French language classroom environment.

In the case of students with no prior knowledge of French, but who still wish to enter in Grades Six or Seven, there is a one-year introductory program which uses a multimedia, audio-visual approach to motivate the students to develop their competency to as high a level as possible. "Intro" students still attend regular classes in English, Guidance, Music, Art and Physical Education with the other students of their entry grade. This dynamic approach allows the introductory students to more easily integrate into the regular classes the following year, with additional support classes given to anyone who requires it.

High school
Unlike most other Ontario schools, TFS completes the elementary school program (Grades 1–8) in seven years and retains a five-year high school instead of the Ontario four-year Grade 9-12 model. In this way, TFS maintains the provincial norm of 12 years of schooling, but dedicates the last five of these years to preparing students for a strong OSSD and the completion of the challenging requirements of the International Brevet and the IB Diploma.

In this different system, Grades Eight to Twelve are split into Levels I to V. In Level I, students are prepared for the French Brevet Diploma through greater emphasis placed on the French curricula in the Social Sciences, French and Math. By the end of that year, all students wishing to attempt to get the Brevet Diploma will have done several practice tests known as the "Brevet Blanc". In the next year, Level II, they will then be able to take part in the official Brevet Exam, with scores being sent to them by the following year. In general, over 95% of TFS students attempting the International Brevet will pass.

Once the Brevet years are over, students go through an intermediary period known as Level III where they are taught most Ontario Grade 11 material. It is this year that students are introduced to some of the way in which IB classes will work. They are taught how to do proper IB labs in the three Science classes, how to write IB commentaries in their Language classes and are given the basics that they will need for IB Mathematics. Furthermore, students are for the first time allowed to take the majority of their subjects in English, with even the possibility that every subject taken is in English, other than French. Once again, this shift in the school's method is meant as a preparatory measure for the IB program.

Academic program
Students are taught mainly in French from pre-kindergarten through Grade 10. From Grade 11 on, the students have a choice of doing their courses in English or French. The school is accredited by the Ministry of Education of France through Grade 10 and by the Ministry of Education of Ontario throughout its entire range. Students are offered an expanded choice of courses in English in high school, though many courses are offered in French during the high school years as well. Students may study Latin, Spanish, German or Ancient Greek as well.  All students study French throughout all of their years at the school. TFS requires its students to enroll for the International Baccalaureate Diploma (an externally moderated curriculum offered by the International Baccalaureate Organization (IBO)) and also offers, and recommends the Brevet des collèges. Examinations are taken in May of students' graduating year. The school covers the normal Ontario Grades 6, 7 and 8 curriculum in two years (Grades 6 and 7), thereby allowing students to start high school (Grade 9) at the age of Grade 8 students. Like other students in Ontario, TFS students graduate at the age of 18, as the high school extends over five years, the last two of which are the IB years.

IB curriculum

TFS courses
Group 1: English A1 (HL/SL) – a first language, normally native to the student, which must include a study of world literature

Group 2: French A2 (HL/SL) – a language in which the student approaches near-native competence (A2) or French B (HL) – non-native competence

Group 3: Individuals and Societies (HL/SL) – History, Geography or Economics

Group 4: Experimental Sciences (HL/SL) – Biology, Chemistry or Physics

Group 5: Mathematics – Mathematics (HL), Mathematics (SL) or Mathematical Studies (SL)

Group 6 or 6th subject: One elective (HL/SL) chosen from:
– Group 2: a classical language (Latin, Classical Greek) or a modern language (Mandarin, Spanish)
– Group 3: a second subject from this group
– Group 4: a second subject from this group
– Group 5: Computer Science
– Group 6: Visual Arts or Theatre

A. Extended Essay – an independent research paper of 4,000 words on a topic chosen by each student, written under the guidance of a supervisor and assessed by an International Baccalaureate examiner.  More information regarding the Extended Essay is available here.

B. Theory of Knowledge – a unique course of study which asks students to reflect critically upon knowledge claims and judgments made in a wide range of academic and experiential areas

C. Creativity, Action, Service – the CAS program requires students to be involved in creative pursuits, physical activities and community service for a total of 150 hours over the two IB years. A minimum of 50 hours must be dedicated to each component of this program.  More information regarding the CAS program is available here.

Bilingual diploma
The International Baccalaureate Bilingual Diploma is awarded to students presenting a Language A2 and/or a Social Science course and/or an Experimental Science course in a language different from their Language A1 as well as to those who write an extended essay in a language different from their Language A1 in a Group 3 or 4 subject (i.e. In History, Geography, Economics, Philosophy, Psychology, Social and cultural anthropology, Business and Management, Islamic History, ITGS, Biology, Chemistry, Physics, Environmental Systems or Design Technology).

Notable alumni
Prince Hermann Friedrich of Leiningen
Samantha Nutt, doctor and founder of NGO War Child Canada
Martha Hall Findlay, former Member of Parliament (MP) in the Willowdale riding and Liberal Party leadership candidate in 2006.
Molly Shoichet, a prominent medical engineer at the University of Toronto
Steven Shehori, a multiple award-winning playwright, director, television writer and Huffington Post contributor. 
Alykhan Velshi, former Director of Communications for Jason Kenney, Minister of Immigration, Citizenship and Multiculturalism in the Conservative Harper government.
Jamie Kastner, documentary filmmaker
Elaine Lui
 Richard Charlton Bogart, partner at Bogart, Robertson & Chu, prominent fundraiser for ALS Society of Ontario
Gabriela Stafford, Olympic runner
Lucia Stafford, Olympic runner
Yvan Baker, Member of Provincial Parliament (Ontario) (MPP) in the Etobicoke Centre riding
Dalton Kellett, IndyCar driver
Kyllike Sillaste-Elling, NATO Ambassador
Justin Poy, creative media and advertising entrepreneur
Julia Bentley, Canadian High Commissioner to Malaysia
Celeste Yim, comedian and writer for Saturday Night Live

References

External links

 Toronto French School website
 Sejasrun.com

Educational institutions established in 1962
International Baccalaureate schools in Ontario
French-language elementary schools in Ontario
French-language high schools in Ontario
Elementary schools in Toronto
High schools in Toronto
Private schools in Toronto
International schools in Toronto
Organizations based in Canada with royal patronage
AEFE accredited schools
1962 establishments in Ontario